Kitselas, also Kitsalas, is an unincorporated settlement, otherwise known as Kitselas Indian Reserve No. 1 of the Kitselas subgroup of the Tsimshian people located on the Skeena River in northwestern British Columbia, Canada.  Kitselas means "people of the village at the canyon" in the Tsimshian language.  The band government of the Kitselas people is the Kitselas First Nation, headquartered at Gitaus, another location within the canyon.

The name is also that of the Canadian National Railway point in this area.  It originally was to be named, or was proposed to be named "Vanarsdol" for C.C. Van Arsdoll, an engineer for the Grand Trunk Pacific Railway who was responsible for construction of its route through the Rocky Mountains. His nickname was "Four-tenths Van", earned as a result of his famous ultimatum to surveyors that the grade of the railway route was not to exceed four-tenths of one percent.

See also
Kitselas Canyon
Kitselas

References

Tsimshian
Skeena Country
Unincorporated settlements in British Columbia